An electronic badge (or electronic conference badge) is a gadget that is a replacement for a traditional paper-based badge or pass issued at public events. It is mainly handed out at computer (security) conferences and hacker events. Their main feature is to display the name of the attendee, but due to their electronic nature they can include a variety of software. The badges were originally a tradition at DEF CON, but spread across different events.

Examples

Hardware 
 SHA2017 badge, which included an e-ink screen and an ESP32
 Card10 for CCCamp2019
 Electromagnetic Field Camp badge

Software 
The organization badge.team has developed a platform called "Hatchery" to publish and develop software for several badges.

References  

Computer hardware
Hacker culture